Animas Valley Mall is an enclosed regional center shopping mall in Farmington, New Mexico. Its anchors are Dillard's, JCPenney, Ross Dress for Less, and Animas Cinema 10.

The mall is the largest shopping center and a regional draw in the Four Corners area.

History
The mall was first announced in 1980, planned to have 5 anchors including Sears, Dillard's, Bealls Brothers, and H.J. Wilson, and was to be built by Gottlieb Corp to designs by Alan B Feingold Architects Inc for a 1982 opening. The mall opened as scheduled in 1982.

In October 2016, Ulta Beauty opened at the mall. Also in 2016, Hibbett Sports opened in the mall.

The mall was owned by General Growth Properties until Rouse Properties was spun off from the company in 2012. Rouse was acquired by Brookfield Properties in 2016.

On November 7, 2019, it was announced that Sears would be closing this location a part of a plan to close 96 stores nationwide. The store closed on February 3, 2020.

References

External links 

Farmington, New Mexico
Brookfield Properties
Shopping malls in New Mexico
Shopping malls established in 1982